Shaquielle McKissic (born August 17, 1990) is an American-born naturalized Azerbaijani professional basketball player for Olympiacos of the Greek Basket League and the EuroLeague.

Collegiate career
In the 2009–10 and 2012–13 season, McKissic played for the Edmonds Community College. In 2013, McKissic started playing for the Arizona State Sun Devils. In his final season, he averaged 12.4 points and 4.7 rebounds per game for the Sun Devils.

Professional career
In July 2015, McKissic joined Victoria Libertas Pesaro of the Italian Serie A.

On December 7, 2015, McKissic signed with the Changwon LG Sakers of the South Korean KBL. In his season in South Korea, he averaged 16.1 points per game in the KBL.

In June 2016, McKissic signed with Muratbey Uşak Sportif in Turkey.

On June 29, 2017, McKissic signed a one-year deal with Gran Canaria. On December 6, 2017, he parted ways with Gran Canaria after averaging 5.5 points per game in the Liga ACB, due to disciplinary reasons after alleging a confrontation with coach Luis Casimiro. Six days later, he signed with Russian club Avtodor Saratov for the rest of the 2017–18 season.

On July 5, 2019, McKissic signed a one-year contract with Beşiktaş Sompo Japan of the Turkish Basketball Super League (BSL). On February 1, 2020, McKissic opted out of his contract with the club. He averaged 16.6 points per game in the Champions League, along with 17.6 points in the BSL.

On February 10, 2020, McKissic signed with Olympiacos of the EuroLeague. On February 7, 2021, he signed a two-year extension with the team.

National team career
In June 2017, McKissic received an Azerbaijani passport and he then became a member of the senior Azerbaijan national basketball team.

Personal life
McKissic portrayed high school basketball star Doug 'Easy' Ryder in the 2011 film Rock Paper Scissors. In May 2019, he was married to Beril McKissic.

Career statistics

EuroLeague

|-
| style="text-align:left;"| 2019–20
| style="text-align:left;" rowspan=2| Olympiacos
| 3 || 3 || 26.0 || .529 || .273 || .400 || 2.0 || 1.7 || 1.0 || .7|| 13.7 || 10.3
|-
| style="text-align:left;"| 2020–21
| 33 || 12 || 23.4 || .429 || .307 || .716 || 2.3 || 2.2 || 1.5 || .2 || 10.7 || 9.8
|-
|- class="sortbottom"
| style="text-align:center;" colspan=2| Career
| 36 || 15 || 23.6 || .440 || .304 || .702 || 2.3 || 2.1 || 1.4 || .2 || 11.0 || 9.8

References

External links

 Shaquielle McKissic at Euroleague.net
 Shaquielle McKissic at RealGM.com
 Shaquielle McKissic at Eurobasket.com
 Shaquielle McKissic at tblstat.net 
 Shaquielle McKissic  at acb.com 
 Shaquielle McKissic at legabasket.it 
 

1990 births
Living people
American expatriate basketball people in Greece
American expatriate basketball people in Italy
American expatriate basketball people in Russia
American expatriate basketball people in South Korea
American expatriate basketball people in Spain
American expatriate basketball people in Turkey
American men's basketball players
Arizona State Sun Devils men's basketball players
Azerbaijani men's basketball players
Azerbaijani people of African-American descent
Basketball players from Seattle
BC Avtodor Saratov players
Beşiktaş men's basketball players
CB Gran Canaria players
Changwon LG Sakers players
Gaziantep Basketbol players
Junior college men's basketball players in the United States
Liga ACB players
Olympiacos B.C. players
Shooting guards
Small forwards
Uşak Sportif players
Victoria Libertas Pallacanestro players
American emigrants to Azerbaijan
Naturalized citizens of Azerbaijan